Antonín Schwarz (born 14 February 1940) is a Czech sports shooter. He competed in the men's 50 metre rifle three positions event at the 1976 Summer Olympics.

References

1940 births
Living people
Czech male sport shooters
Olympic shooters of Czechoslovakia
Shooters at the 1976 Summer Olympics
Sportspeople from Plzeň